Silz is a municipality in the Imst district and is located  east of Imst and  west of Telfs. The ski resort Kühtai administratively belongs to the village area. Besides winter tourism also summer tourism, especially rafting on the Inn River, is an important source of income for Silz.

Population

Notable people
 

Helmuth Orthner (1941–2009), American scientist

References

External links

 Official web presence of the municipality of Silz 

Cities and towns in Imst District